Yaqubabad (also Romanized as Yaʿqūbābād) is a village in Shirin Darreh Rural District, in the Central District of Quchan County, Razavi Khorasan Province, Iran. At the 2006 census, its population was 38, in 9 families.

References 

Populated places in Quchan County